The following highways are numbered 818:

United States